Kost Hordiyenko (unknown  - 15 May 1733) was a Zaporozhian Cossack Kosh otaman. After 1709 he allied with Ivan Mazepa, and co-authored the Constitution of Pylyp Orlyk.

Hordiyenko was born in the Poltava region, Hetmanate. He studied at the Kyiv Mohyla Academy. Later he joined the Zaporizhian Sich, headed the Cossack troops (1702-1706, 1707-1709, 1710—1728). As an allied of Mazepa fought in the Battle of Poltava.

References

Literature 
 

18th-century Ukrainian people
Kosh Otamans
People of the Great Northern War
Year of birth unknown
1733 deaths